The catalogue raisonné by Franca Zava Boccazzi of the paintings of Giambattista Pittoni lists 247 extant and 117 lost, missing or destroyed works. The catalogue raisonné by Alice Binion of his drawings includes 304 items. Some of his works are listed below.

Paintings 
 In the Louvre Museum, Paris:
 Christ grants Keys of Paradise to St Peter 
 Continence of Scipio (1733-1735)
 Susanna and the Elders (1723-1725)
 Allegorical Tomb of Archbishop John Tillotson (1630-1694) (1726-1727)
 Bacchus and Ariadne (1720-1725)
 Mars and Venus (1720-1725)
 Sacrifice of Polyxena at the Tomb of Achilles
 Dido founds Carthage
Holy family, Metropolitan Museum of Art, New York
Hagar in Desert, Church of Frari, Venice; Oil on Canvas
Justice and Peace, Ca' Pesaro, Venice; fresco
The Nativity with God the Father and the Holy Ghost (1740), National Gallery, London
Susanna and the Elders (1720), Metropolitan Museum of Art, New York City
 St Elizabeth distributing Alms (1734), Szépmûvészeti Múzeum, Budapest; Oil on canvas, 72 x 43 cm
 The family (1740), private collection
Sacrifice of Isaac (1720), Church of San Francesco della Vigna, Venice; Oil on Canvas, 118 x 155 cm
 Descent from the Cross (c. 1750), Palace of Legion of Honor, San Francisco, California
 Sacrifice of Polyxena (1733-1734), Getty Museum, Los Angeles
 Christ and St Peter, Ashmolean Museum, Oxford
 Annunciation (1758), Accademia, Venice
 Death of Joseph, Berggruen Museum in Charlottenburg Palace, National Gallery (Berlin), Berlin; Oil on canvas, 97 x 79 cm
 St Jerome and St Peter of Alcantara (1725), National Gallery of Scotland, Edinburgh; Oil on canvas, 275 x 143 cm
 Penitent Magdalene (1740) Accademia, Venice, Oil on canvas, 48 x 38 cm
 Sacrifice of Polyxena, Hermitage Museum, St Petersburg; Oil on canvas, 129 x 94 cm
 Vision of St Anthony of Padua (1730), San Diego Museum of Art, Balboa Park, California; 35 1/2 in. x 23 1/4 in. 
 David and Bathsheba, 74x64 cm
 Finding of Moses (c. 1730), Portland Art Museum, Oregon
 Miracle of the loaves and fishes (1725), National Gallery of Victoria, Melbourne; oil on canvas, 120.1x178.5 cm 
 Martyrdom of St Thomas, Church of San Stae, Venice
 Death of Sophonisba, Pushkin Museum, Moscow; oil on canvas, 165 x 214 cm
 Rest on the Flight into Egypt (1725), Thyssen-Bornemisza Museum, Madrid; oil on canvas, 108 x 135 cm
 St Roch (1727), Szépmûvészeti Múzeum,  Budapest; oil on canvas, 42 x 32 cm
 Allegorical monument to the glory of Isaac Newton (c. 1727-29), Fitzwilliam Museum, Cambridge
 Nativity, Musée des Beaux-Arts, Quimper; oil on canvas, 74 × 56 cm
 Stoning of St Stephen, 2nd left picture of the Church's altar of S. Maria Diessen
 Death of Agripina and Death of Seneca, Dresden Gallery
 Eliezer and Rebecca (c. 1725), Musée des Beaux-arts, Bordeaux
 Enthroned Madonna and Child venerated by Saints Peter and Pius V (1723-1724), Church of Santa Corona, Vicenza
 Madonna with Saints, Church of San Germano dei Berici
 Diane and Acteon (c. 1725), Palazzo Chiericati, Vicenza;  oil on canvas, 147 x 197.5 cm
 Sacrifice by Jephthah, Museo di Palazzo Reale, Genoa
 Portrait of Cardinal Bartolomeo Roverella, Accademia dei Concordi, Rovigo
 Jupiter protect Justice, The Peace and the Science, Plafonds decoration, Ca' Pesaro, Venice
 Saints presenting a devout Woman to Virgin and Child, Cleveland Museum of Art
 Allegory of Painting and Sculpture, Gallerie dell'Accademia, Venice
 Annunciation,  Städelsches Kunstinstitut
 Madonna of Sorrows, Museum Gemäldegalerie (Stiftung Preussischer Kulturbesitz)
 Martyrdom of St Clement: Sketch for Altar at Clemenskirche, Muenster, displayed at Uppsala Universitet Konstsamling
 St Peter, Kunsthalle
Virgin and Child with Saints, Prado Museum, Madrid. Oil on canvas 36 x 32 cm
Triumphal Entry of Alexander into Babylonia, 1735, Patrimonio Nacional, Spain.

References

P
Works of art